USCGC Blackthorn (WLB-391)  was a  seagoing buoy tender (WLB) which sank in 1980 in a collision near the Tampa Bay Sunshine Skyway Bridge, resulting in 23 crew member fatalities. 
An Iris-class vessel, she was built by Marine Ironworks and Shipbuilding Corporation in Duluth, Minnesota. Blackthorns preliminary design was completed by the United States Lighthouse Service and the final design was produced by Marine Iron and Shipbuilding Corporation in Duluth. On 21 May 1943 the keel was laid, she was launched on 20 July 1943 and commissioned on 27 March 1944. The original cost for the hull and machinery was $876,403.

Blackthorn was one of 39 original  seagoing buoy tenders built between 1942 and 1944. All but one of the original tenders, were built in Duluth.

Blackthorn was initially assigned to the Great Lakes for ice-breaking duties, but after only a few months, she was reassigned to San Pedro, California.  She served in San Pedro for several years before being brought into the gulf coast region to serve in Mobile, Alabama then transferred to Galveston, Texas for the final years of her service until the accident.

In 1979–1980, Blackthorn underwent a major overhaul in Tampa, Florida. On 28 January 1980, while leaving Tampa Bay after the overhaul, she collided with the tanker SS Capricorn.  Shortly after the collision, Blackthorn capsized, killing 23 of her crew. The cutter was raised for the investigation, and was scuttled in the Gulf of Mexico after the investigation was complete. She currently serves as an artificial reef for recreational diving and fishing.

The accident 
Having just completed her overhaul at the Gulf Tampa Drydock Company, which included overhaul of the main propulsion generators, Blackthorn was outward bound from Tampa Bay on the night of 28 January 1980. Meanwhile, the tanker Capricorn, owned by Kingston Shipping Company and operated by Apex Marine Corporation of New York, was standing (traveling with right-of-way) into the bay. Blackthorns captain, Lieutenant Commander George Sepel had departed the ship's bridge to investigate a problem with the newly-installed propulsion shaft.  Ensign John Ryan had the conn.

Earlier the cutter had been overtaken by the Kazakhstan, a Russian passenger ship. When requested by Kazakhstan to pass, the Blackthorn navigated starboard permitting Kazakhstan to pass. The Blackthorn then navigated to almost mid-channel and resumed course. (Some contend that the brightly lit passenger vessel obscured the ability of the crews of Blackthorn and Capricorn to see each other.)

Capricorn began to turn left, but this course would not allow Capricorn and Blackthorn to pass port-to-port, as the rules of navigation generally required. Unable to make radio contact with Blackthorn, Capricorns pilot blew two short whistle blasts to have the ships pass starboard-to-starboard. With the Blackthorn's officer of the deck (Ensign Ryan) confused in regard to the standard operating procedure and rules of navigation, Blackthorns captain issued orders for evasive action. Despite the Blackthorn's evasive action, a collision occurred.

Damage to the Blackthorn from the initial impact was not extensive. However, Capricorns anchor was ready to be let go. The anchor became embedded in the Blackthorns hull and ripped open the port side above the water line.  Then as the two ships backed away from each other, the chain became taut.  The force of the much larger ship pulling on it, caused Blackthorn to tip on her side until she suddenly capsized. Six off-duty personnel who had mustered when they heard the collision alarm were trapped inside the ship. Several crew members who had just reported aboard tried to escape and in the process trapped themselves in the engine room. Although 27 crewmen survived the collision, 23 perished.

Primary responsibility for the collision was placed on the Blackthorns captain, Lt. Commander Sepel, as he had made an inexperienced junior officer (Ensign Ryan) officer of the deck and allowed him to navigate the ship through an unfamiliar waterway with heavy traffic.

The Commandant of the United States Coast Guard, Admiral John B. Hayes, approved the report of the marine board of investigation on the collision between Blackthorn and Capricorn. The board determined that the cause of the collision was the failure of both vessels to keep well to the side of the channel which lay on each ship's starboard (right) sides. Concurring with the marine board's determination of the cause, the Commandant emphasized in his "Action" that the failure of the persons in charge of both vessels to ascertain the intentions of the other through the exchange of appropriate whistle signals was the primary contributing cause. Additionally, Admiral Hayes pointed out that attempts to establish a passing agreement by using only radiotelephone communications failed to be an adequate substitute for exchanging proper whistle signals.

The marine board found evidence of violation of various navigation laws on the parts of Capricorns master and pilot. There were similar findings on the part of Blackthorns commanding officer and officer of the deck. These matters were referred to the commanders of the Seventh and Eighth Coast Guard Districts for further investigation and appropriate action.

The Commandant also acted on various safety recommendations made by the marine board concerning training and equipment aboard Coast Guard vessels, and navigation considerations in Tampa Bay.

Seaman Apprentice William "Billy" Flores 

Seaman Apprentice William "Billy" Flores was originally from Carlsbad, New Mexico and attended Western Hills High School in Fort Worth, Texas. In 2000 he was posthumously awarded the Coast Guard Medal, the service's highest award for heroism in peacetime. 
SA Flores, who had been out of boot camp just one year, opened the life jacket locker as Blackthorn capsized, securing its hatch open with his belt, and made sure that his shipmates were able to access and use the life jackets. His actions saved a number of lives during the accident. His heroic role was initially overlooked by the two official reports by the Coast Guard and the NTSB, but was later given the recognition he deserved. His family was presented with the Medal on 28 January 2000, the 20th anniversary of the tragedy. Seaman Apprentice Flores died aboard Blackthorn. In October 2010, it was announced that the third new Sentinel-class fast response cutter, a 154-foot patrol boat, would be named for Flores.  In May 2021, Flores was awarded the Texas Legislative Medal of Honor for his actions on USCGC Blackthorn.

Gallery

References

External links
Marine Casualty Report: USCGC Blackthorn, SS Capricorn, Collision in Tampa Bay on 28 January 1980 with Loss of Life, U.S. Coast Guard Marine Board of Investigation Report" (1980)
USCG Blackthorn history webpage
National Park Service Report on the  buoy tenders

Article about 20th Anniversary of the sinking
Coast Guard photos of Blackthorn

Historic American Engineering Record in Texas
Iris-class seagoing buoy tenders
Maritime incidents in 1980
1943 ships
Ships built in Duluth, Minnesota
Ships sunk in collisions